Paul Charles Morphy (June 22, 1837 – July 10, 1884) was an American chess player. Living before chess had a formal world championship, he was widely acknowledged to be the greatest chess master of his era.  He won the tournament of the First American Chess Congress of 1857, winning matches with each opponent by lopsided margins.  He then traveled to England and France to challenge the leading players of Europe.  He played formal and informal matches with most of the leading English and French players, and others including Adolf Anderssen of Germany, again winning all matches by large margins.  He then returned to the United States, and before long abandoned competitive chess.  A chess prodigy, he was called "The Pride and Sorrow of Chess" because he had a brilliant chess career but retired from the game while still young. Commentators agree that he was far ahead of his time as a chess player, though there is disagreement on how his play ranks compared to modern players.

Biography

Early life
Morphy was born in New Orleans to a wealthy and distinguished family. His father, Alonzo Michael Morphy, a lawyer, served as a Louisiana state legislator, Attorney General, and a Louisiana State Supreme Court Justice. Alonzo, who held Spanish nationality, was of Spanish, Portuguese, and Irish ancestry. Morphy's mother, Louise Thérèse Félicité Thelcide Le Carpentier, was the musically talented daughter of a prominent French Creole family. Morphy grew up in an atmosphere of genteel civility and culture where chess and music were the typical highlights of a Sunday home gathering.

Sources differ about when and how Morphy learned how to play chess. According to his uncle, Ernest Morphy, no one formally taught Morphy how to play chess; rather, Morphy learned on his own as a young child simply from watching others play. After silently watching a lengthy game between Ernest and Alonzo, which they abandoned as drawn, young Paul surprised them by stating that Ernest should have won. His father and uncle had not realized that Paul knew the moves, let alone any chess strategy. They were even more surprised when Paul proved his claim by resetting the pieces and demonstrating the win his uncle had missed.  In 1845, Ernest acted as the second for Eugène Rousseau in Rousseau's match with Charles H. Stanley, and Paul was taken along.

Childhood victories
By the age of nine, Morphy was considered one of the best players in New Orleans. In 1846, General Winfield Scott visited the city on his way to the Mexican War and let his hosts know that he desired an evening of chess with a strong local player. Chess was an infrequent pastime of Scott's, but he enjoyed the game and considered himself a formidable player. After dinner, the chess pieces were set up and Scott's opponent was brought in: diminutive, nine-year-old Morphy.  Scott was at first offended, thinking he was being made fun of, but he consented to play after being assured that his wishes had been scrupulously obeyed and that the boy was a "chess prodigy" who would prove his skill. Morphy easily won both of their two games, the second time  after only six moves.

During 1848 and 1849, Morphy played the leading New Orleans players. Against the strongest of these, Eugène Rousseau, he played at least fifty games, and lost at most five.

In 1850, when Morphy was twelve, the strong professional Hungarian chess master Johann Löwenthal visited New Orleans. Löwenthal, who had often played and defeated talented youngsters, considered the informal match a waste of time but accepted the offer as a courtesy to the well-to-do judge.

Löwenthal soon realized he was up against a formidable opponent. Each time Morphy made a good move, Löwenthal's eyebrows shot up in a manner described by Ernest Morphy as "comique". Löwenthal played three games with Paul Morphy during his New Orleans stay, scoring two losses and one draw (or, according to another source, losing all three).

Schooling and the First American Chess Congress

After 1850, Morphy did not play much chess for a long time. Studying diligently, he graduated from Spring Hill College in Mobile, Alabama, in 1854. He then stayed on an extra year, studying mathematics and philosophy. He was awarded an A.M. degree with the highest honors in May 1855.

He studied law at the University of Louisiana (now Tulane University) and received an L.L.B. degree on April 7, 1857. During his studies, Morphy is said to have memorized the complete Louisiana Civil Code.

Not yet of legal age to begin the practice of law, Morphy found himself with free time. He received an invitation to participate in the First American Chess Congress, to be held in New York from October 6 to November 10, 1857. He at first declined, but at the urging of his uncle eventually decided to play. He defeated each of his rivals, including James Thompson, Alexander Beaufort Meek, and two strong German masters, Theodor Lichtenhein and Louis Paulsen, the latter two in the semifinal and final rounds. Morphy was hailed as the chess champion of the United States, but he appeared unaffected by his sudden fame. According to the December 1857 issue of Chess Monthly, "his genial disposition, his unaffected modesty and gentlemanly courtesy have endeared him to all his acquaintances." In the fall of 1857, staying in New York, Morphy played 261 games, both regular and at odds. His overall score in regular games was 87 wins, 8 draws, and 5 losses.

Daniel Fiske recruited Morphy to be co-editor of his Chess Monthly, starting in early 1858 after the Congress, and Morphy held the position until the end of 1860.

Europe

Up to this time, Morphy was not well known or highly regarded in Europe. Despite his dominance of the US chess scene, the quality of his opponents was relatively low compared to Europe, where most of the best chess players lived. European opinion was that they should not have to make the journey to the United States to play a young and relatively unknown player, especially as the US had few other quality players to make such a trip worthwhile.

Morphy returned to his home city with no further action. The New Orleans Chess Club determined that a challenge should be made directly to the European champion Howard Staunton.

Staunton made an official reply through The Illustrated London News stating that it was not possible for him to travel to the United States and that Morphy must come to Europe if he wished to challenge him and other European chess players.

Eventually, Morphy went to Europe to play Staunton and other chess greats. Morphy made numerous attempts at setting up a match with Staunton, but none ever came through. Staunton was later criticised for avoiding a match with Morphy, although his peak as a player had been in the 1840s and he was considered past his prime by the late 1850s. Staunton is known to have been working on his edition of the complete works of Shakespeare at the time, but he also competed in a chess tournament during Morphy's visit. Staunton later blamed Morphy for the failure to have a match, suggesting among other things that Morphy lacked the funds required for match stakes—a most unlikely charge given Morphy's popularity. Morphy also remained resolutely opposed to playing chess for money, reportedly due to family pressure.

Seeking new opponents, Morphy crossed the English Channel to France. At the Café de la Régence in Paris, the center of chess in France, Morphy soundly defeated resident chess professional Daniel Harrwitz. In the same place and in an other performance of his skills, he defeated eight opponents in blindfolded simultaneous chess.

In Paris, Morphy suffered from a bout of gastroenteritis. In accordance with the medical wisdom of the time, he was treated with leeches, resulting in his losing a significant amount of blood. Although too weak to stand up unaided, Morphy insisted on going ahead with a match against the visiting German master Adolf Anderssen, considered by many to be Europe's leading player. The match between Morphy and Anderssen took place between December 20, 1858, and December 28, 1858, when Morphy was still aged 21. Despite his illness Morphy triumphed easily, winning seven while losing two, with two draws. When asked about his defeat, Anderssen claimed to be out of practice, but also admitted that Morphy was in any event the stronger player and that he was fairly beaten. Anderssen also attested that in his opinion, Morphy was the strongest player ever to play the game, even stronger than the famous French champion La Bourdonnais.</ref>

Both in England and France, Morphy gave numerous simultaneous exhibitions, including displays of blindfold chess in which he regularly played and defeated eight opponents at a time. Morphy played a well-known casual game against the Duke of Brunswick and Count Isouard at the Italian Opera House in Paris.

Hailed as World Chess Champion

Still only 21 years old, Morphy was now quite famous. While in Paris, he was sitting in his hotel room one evening, chatting with his companion Frederick Edge, when they had an unexpected visitor. "I am Prince Galitzin; I wish to see Mr. Morphy", the visitor said, according to Edge. Morphy identified himself to the visitor. "No, it is not possible!" the prince exclaimed, "You are too young!" Prince Galitzin then explained that he was in the frontiers of Siberia when he had first heard of Morphy's "wonderful deeds". He explained, "One of my suite had a copy of the chess paper published in Berlin, the Schachzeitung, and ever since that time I have been wanting to see you." He then told Morphy that he must go to Saint Petersburg, Russia, because the chess club in the Imperial Palace would receive him with enthusiasm.

Morphy offered to play a match with Harrwitz, giving odds of pawn and move, and even offered to find stakes to back his opponent, but the offer was declined. Morphy then declared that he would play no more formal matches, with anyone, without giving at least those odds.

In Europe, Morphy was generally hailed as world chess champion. In Paris, at a banquet held in his honor on April 4, 1859, a laurel wreath was placed over the head of a bust of Morphy, carved by the sculptor Eugène-Louis Lequesne. Morphy was declared by the assembly "the best chess player that ever lived". At a similar gathering in London, where he returned in the spring of 1859, Morphy was again proclaimed "the Champion of the World". He was also invited to a private audience with Queen Victoria. At a simultaneous match against five masters, Morphy won two games against Jules Arnous de Rivière and Henry Edward Bird, drew two games with Samuel Boden and Johann Jacob Löwenthal, and lost one to Thomas Wilson Barnes.

Upon his return to America, the accolades continued as Morphy toured the major cities on his way home. At the University of the City of New York, on May 29, 1859, John Van Buren, son of President Martin Van Buren, ended a testimonial presentation by proclaiming, "Paul Morphy, Chess Champion of the World". In Boston, at a banquet attended by Henry Wadsworth Longfellow, Louis Agassiz, Boston mayor Frederic W. Lincoln Jr., and Harvard president James Walker, Dr. Oliver Wendell Holmes toasted "Paul Morphy, the World Chess Champion". Morphy's celebrity drew manufacturers who sought his endorsements, newspapers asked him to write chess columns, and a baseball club was named after him.

Morphy was engaged to write a series of chess columns for the New York Ledger, which started in August of 1859.  They consisted primarily of annotating games of the La Bourdonnais – McDonnell chess matches of 25 years before, plus a few of Morphy's own games.  The column ended in August of 1860.

Abandonment of chess

After returning home in 1859, Morphy intended to start a career in law.  He did not immediately cease playing serious chess; for example, on a visit to Cuba in 1864 he played a number of games with leading players of that country, including Celso Golmayo, the champion, all at odds of a knight.  But he played in no tournaments, or serious matches without giving odds, for the rest of his life.

Morphy was late to start his law career. He had not done so by 1861 at the outbreak of the American Civil War. His brother Edward had at the very start joined the army of the Confederacy, whereas his mother and sisters emigrated to Paris. Morphy's Civil War service is a rather gray area. David Lawson states "it may be that he was on Beauregard's staff (Confederate Army) for a short while and that he had been seen at Manassas, as had been reported". Lawson also recounts a story by a resident of Richmond in 1861 who describes Morphy as then being "an officer on Beauregard's staff". Other sources indicate that general Pierre Beauregard considered Morphy unqualified, but that Morphy had indeed applied to him. During the war he lived partly in New Orleans and partly abroad, spending time in Havana (1862, 1864) and Paris (1863).

Morphy was unable to successfully build a law practice after the war ended in 1865. His attempts to open a law office failed; when he had visitors, they invariably wanted to talk about chess, not their legal affairs. Financially secure thanks to his family's fortune, Morphy essentially spent the rest of his life in idleness. Asked by admirers to return to chess competition, he refused. In 1883 he met Wilhelm Steinitz (who had tried unsuccessfully to get Morphy to agree to a match in the 1860s) in New Orleans, but declined to discuss chess with him.

In accord with the prevailing sentiment of the time, Morphy esteemed chess only as an amateur activity, considering the game unworthy of pursuit as a serious occupation.

Starting around 1875, Morphy showed signs of a persecution complex; he sued his brother-in-law, and tried to provoke a duel with a friend. His best friend Charles Maurian noted in some letters that Morphy was "deranged" and "not right mentally". In 1875, his mother, brother and a friend tried to admit him to a Catholic sanitarium, but Morphy was so well able to argue for his rights and sanity that they sent him away.

Death

On the afternoon of July 10, 1884, Morphy was found dead in his bathtub in New Orleans at the age of 47. According to the autopsy, Morphy had suffered a stroke brought on by entering cold water after a long walk in the midday heat. A lifelong Catholic, Paul Morphy was buried in the family tomb in St. Louis Cemetery #1, New Orleans, Louisiana. The Morphy mansion, sold by the family in 1891, later became the site of the restaurant Brennan's.

Ernest Jones published an article of psychoanalytic discussion of Morphy.  Reuben Fine published a longer article in which Morphy was mentioned.  Both articles have been criticized for the use of unreliable historical sources.

Fine wrote that Morphy "arranged women's shoes into a semi-circle around his bed", and this has been widely copied and embellished upon. But it is a misquotation from a booklet written by Morphy's niece, Regina Morphy-Voitier. She wrote: Now we come to the room which Paul Morphy occupied, and which was separated from his mother's by a narrow hall. Morphy's room was always kept in perfect order, for he was very particular and neat, yet this room had a peculiar aspect and at once struck the visitor as such, for Morphy had a dozen or more pairs of shoes of all kinds which he insisted in keeping arranged in a semi-circle in the middle of the room, explaining with his sarcastic smile that in this way, he could at once lay his hands on the particular pair he desired to wear. In a huge porte-manteau he kept all his clothes which were at all times neatly pressed and creased.

Morphy's niece's description of Morphy's organization of his  shoes is only a starting point for the lurid descriptions by Fine and subsequent authors.

Playing style

With the white pieces, Morphy usually played 1. e4 and favored gambits, especially the King's Gambit and Evans Gambit, although not exclusively. With the black pieces, Morphy usually answered 1. e4 with 1... e5. The Morphy Defense of the Ruy Lopez (1.e4 e5 2.Nf3 Nc6 3.Bb5 a6) is named after him and remains the most popular variant of that opening.  Against 1. d4, he favored the Dutch Defense, but also tried the Queen's Gambit Declined. In his notes to the games of the La Bourdonnais – McDonnell chess matches he criticized the Sicilian Defense and Queen's Gambit, and the only known instance where he used a Sicilian Defense was a game against Löwenthal in 1858.

Morphy approached the game more seriously than even the strongest of his contemporaries; as Anderssen noted,

Morphy also, according to Garry Kasparov,

Morphy played quickly; in an era before time control was used, he often took less than an hour to make all of his moves, while his opponents would need perhaps eight hours or more. Löwenthal and Anderssen both later remarked that he was very hard to beat, since he knew how to defend well and would draw or even win games despite getting into bad positions. At the same time, he was deadly when given a promising position. Anderssen especially commented on this, saying that, after one bad move against Morphy, one might as well resign. "I win my games in seventy moves but Mr. Morphy wins his in twenty, but that is only natural ..." Anderssen said, explaining his poor results against Morphy.

Legacy
Kasparov maintained that Morphy can be considered both the "forefather of modern chess" and "the first swallow – the prototype of the strong 20th-century grandmaster".

Bobby Fischer ranked Morphy among the ten greatest chess players of all time, and described him as "perhaps the most accurate player who ever lived". He noted that "Morphy and Capablanca had enormous talent", and stated that Morphy had the talent to beat any player of any era if given time to study modern theory and ideas.

Reuben Fine disagreed with Fischer's assessment: "[Morphy's] glorifiers went on to urge that he was the most brilliant genius who had ever appeared. ... But if we examine Morphy's record and games critically, we cannot justify such extravaganza. And we are compelled to speak of it as the Morphy myth. ... He was so far ahead of his rivals that it is hard to find really outstanding examples of his skill... Even if the myth has been destroyed, Morphy remains one of the giants of chess history."

Garry Kasparov, Viswanathan Anand, and Max Euwe argued that Morphy was far ahead of his time. In this regard, Euwe described Morphy as "a chess genius in the most complete sense of the term".

Morphy is frequently mentioned in Walter Tevis's novel The Queen's Gambit and its 2020 Netflix eponymous adaptation, as the favorite player of the main character, a chess prodigy named Beth Harmon.

Results
Here are Morphy's results in matches and  not played at odds:
 + games won; − games lost; = games drawn

Notable games

 Louis Paulsen vs. Morphy, New York 1857; Four Knights Game, Spanish Variation, Classical Variation (C48), . Morphy's queen sacrifice transforms his positional pressure into a decisive attack on Paulsen's king.
 The "Opera Game"—a casual game against amateurs, but at the same time one of the clearest and most beautiful attacking games ever. Often used by chess teachers to demonstrate how to use , develop pieces, and generate threats.
 Morphy vs. Adolf Anderssen, casual game 1858; King's Gambit Accepted, Kieseritzky Gambit, Berlin Defense (C39), .

See also
 List of chess games
 Morphy Number – connections of chess players to Morphy

Notes

References
 Paul Morphy, The Pride and Sorrow of Chess by David Lawson, 424 pages; McKay, 1976. .  – The only book-length biography of Paul Morphy in English, it corrects numerous historical errors that have cropped up, including Morphy's score as a child versus Löwenthal.
 Paul Morphy, The Pride and Sorrow of Chess by David Lawson, 426 pages; University of Louisiana at Lafayette Press, 2010.  .  - Edited by Thomas Aiello.  Includes annotated bibliography of books and articles published since Lawson's original edition.  Omits the sixty game scores in Part II of Lawson's original edition.
 Frederick Milne Edge, Paul Morphy, the Chess Champion. An Account of His Career in America and Europe, D. Appleton and Company, New York 1859. Edge was a newspaperman who attached himself to Morphy during his stay in England and France, accompanying Morphy everywhere, and even acting at times as his unofficial butler and servant. Thanks to Edge, much is known about Morphy that would be unknown otherwise, and many games Morphy played were recorded only thanks to Edge. Contains information about the First American Chess Congress, and the history of English chess clubs in and before Morphy's time.
 Morphy's Games of Chess by Philip W. Sergeant, London, G. Bell & Sons, 1916. Features annotations collected from previous commentators, as well as additions by Sergeant. Has all of Morphy's match, tournament, and exhibition games, and most of his casual and odds games. Short biography included.
 Morphy's Games of Chess by Philip W. Sergeant & Fred Reinfeld, Dover, 1957. . Paperback reprint of Sergeant's original book, with an introduction by Reinfeld.

Further reading

 Paul Morphy and the Evolution of Chess Theory by Macon Shibut, Caissa Editions 1993 . Over 415 games comprising almost all known Morphy games. Chapters on Morphy's place in the development of chess theory, and reprinted articles about Morphy by Steinitz, Alekhine, and others.
 The Chess Genius of Paul Morphy by Max Lange (translated from the original German into English by Ernst Falkbeer), 1860. Reprinted by Moravian Chess under the title, "Paul Morphy, a Sketch from the Chess World". An excellent resource for the European view of Morphy as well as for its biographical information. The English edition was reviewed in Chess Player's Chronicle, 1859.
 Paul Morphy. Sammlung der von ihm gespielten Partien mit ausführlichen Erläuterungen by Géza Maróczy, Veit und Comp., Leipzig 1909. Reprinted by Olms-Verlag, Zürich 1979.
 Grandmasters of Chess by Harold Schonberg, Lippincott, 1973. .
 World Chess Champions by Edward Winter, editor, 1981. . Leading chess historians include Morphy as a de facto world champion, although he never claimed the title.
 Morphy's Games of Chess by J Lowenthal, LONDON, 1893, George Bell & Sons. Probably reprint from c1860, features a short memoir, 1 page intro from Morphy with analytical notes from Löwenthal, including blindfold and handicap games.
 Morphy Gleanings by Philip W. Sergeant, David McKay, 1932. Contributes games not found in Sergeant's earlier work, "Morphy's Games of Chess" and features greater biographical information as well as documentation into the Morphy–Paulsen and the Morphy–Kolisch affairs. Later reprinted as "The Unknown Morphy", Dover, 1973. .
 The World's Great Chess Games by Reuben Fine, Dover, 1983. .
 A First Book of Morphy by Frisco Del Rosario, Trafford, 2004. . Illustrates the teachings of Cecil Purdy and Reuben Fine with 65 annotated games played by the American champion. Algebraic notation.
 Paul Morphy: A Modern Perspective by Valeri Beim, Russell Enterprises, Inc., 2005. . Algebraic notation.
 Life of Paul Morphy in the Vieux Carré of New-Orleans and Abroad by Regina Morphy-Voitier, 1926. Regina Morphy-Voitier, the niece of Paul Morphy, self-published this pamphlet in New York.
 The Chess Players by Frances Parkinson Keyes, Farrar, Straus and Cudahy; 1960. A work of historical fiction in which Morphy is the central character.
 Paul Morphy: Confederate Spy, by Stan Vaughan, Three Towers Press, 2010.  A work of historical fiction in which Morphy is the central character.
 
 The Genius of Paul Morphy by Chris Ward, Cadogan Books, 1997. . Biographical novelization of Morphy's life.
 La odisea de Pablo Morphy en la Habana, 1862–1864 by Andrés Clemente Vázquez, Propaganda Literaria, Havana 1893.
 Paul Morphy. Partidas completas by Rogelio Caparrós, Ediciones Eseuve, Madrid 1993. .

External links

 
 Edward Winter, Edge, Morphy and Staunton
 Morphy's column for the New York Ledger in 1859
 US Chess Hall Of Fame – Paul Morphy
 THE LIFE AND CHESS OF PAUL MORPHY, edochess
  Complete collection of surviving game scores.

1837 births
1884 deaths
19th-century American lawyers
19th-century chess players
American chess players
American people of French descent
American people of Irish descent
American people of Portuguese descent
American people of Spanish descent
American Roman Catholics
Burials in Louisiana
Lawyers from New Orleans
Louisiana Creole people of Spanish descent
People from New Orleans
Sportspeople from New Orleans
Spring Hill College alumni
Tulane University alumni